Klara Nahrstedt is the Ralph and Catherine Fisher Professor of Computer Science at the University of Illinois at Urbana–Champaign, and directs the Coordinated Science Laboratory there. Her research concerns multimedia, quality of service, and middleware.

Nahrstedt earned a diploma in mathematics from the Humboldt University of Berlin in 1984, and a master's degree in numerical analysis from Humboldt University in 1985. She earned a Ph.D. from University of Pennsylvania in 1995, under the supervision of Jonathan M. Smith. She was editor-in-chief of the journal Multimedia Systems (ACM and Springer) from 2000 to 2006, and chair of the ACM Special Interest Group on Multimedia from 2007 to 2013.

In 2012 Nahrstedt was elected as a Fellow of the Association for Computing Machinery "for contributions to quality-of-service management for distributed multimedia systems." She is a Fellow of the Institute of Electrical and Electronics Engineers and a winner of a 2012 IEEE Computer Society Technical Achievement Award "for pioneering contributions to end-to-end quality of service and resource management in wired and wireless networks". In 2013 she became a member of the German Academy of Sciences Leopoldina. In 2022, she was elected to the United States National Academy of Engineering.

Nahrstedt is the daughter of University of California, Berkeley professor Ruzena Bajcsy.

Selected publications
Books
Multimedia Computing, Communications and Applications (with Ralf Steinmetz, Prentice-Hall, 1995)
Multimedia Fundamentals, Vol. I: Media Coding and Content Processing (with Ralf Steinmetz, Prentice-Hall, 2002)
Multimedia Systems (with Ralf Steinmetz, Springer-Verlag, 2004)
Multimedia Applications (with Ralf Steinmetz, Springer-Verlag, 2004)
Quality of Service in Wireless Networks over Unlicensed Spectrum (Morgan & Claypool, Synthesis Lectures on Mobile and Pervasive Computing, 2012)

Papers
.
.
.

References

External links
Google scholar profile

Year of birth missing (living people)
Living people
American computer scientists
German computer scientists
German women computer scientists
Humboldt University of Berlin alumni
University of Pennsylvania alumni
University of Illinois Urbana-Champaign faculty
Fellows of the Association for Computing Machinery
Fellow Members of the IEEE
Members of the German Academy of Sciences Leopoldina
Academic journal editors